The Mouth Agape is a 1974 French drama film directed by Maurice Pialat. It depicts, in a cinematic realist fashion, a woman going through a terminal illness and also dealing with the tumultuous lives of her husband and son. It was one of the least commercially successful of Pialat's films. It was the third film of the ten that he directed before his death in January 2003. It is also known under the titles The Gaping Mouth and The Gaping Maw.

The film stars Monique Mélinand, Philippe Léotard, Hubert Deschamps, and Nathalie Baye in the main roles. Néstor Almendros, the Spanish cinematographer known for working with the Nouvelle Vague directors François Truffaut and Éric Rohmer, collaborated with Pialat for the first time on The Mouth Agape. The title is a poetic reference to the open mouth position sometimes found in corpses.

Plot
Monique Mélinand portrays a woman in the late stages of terminal illness. Her son Philippe (Philippe Léotard), Philippe's wife Nathalie (Nathalie Baye), and her husband Roger (Hubert Deschamps) attempt to comfort her as she navigates through her ordeal. However, those two closest men in her personal life begin to get more involved in their relationships with multiple mistresses. Her husband flirts with customers in their clothing and haberdashery store while her son flirts with her nurses. The film incorporates elements of Mozart’s opera Così fan tutte to poetic effect, relating to these scenes. In the end scenes, she goes through several final, deeply emotional moments as the disease claims her life.

Reception and legacy
La gueule ouverte was one of the least commercially successful of Pialat's films.

Some critics have viewed the film as semi-autobiographical, and it was described as such in a Masters of Cinema re-release. Pialat’s mother died in the same real place as the one depicted in the film, and the Philippe character is somewhat similar to Pialat himself such that he could be an author surrogate.

Critic Noel Megahey of the cinema website The Digital Fix has described the film as having "[a] such intensity and uncommon brutal honesty about a subject that is usually treated with more delicacy and sensitivity that it can be difficult and challenging to the viewer" but that "the effort is certainly rewarded". Critic Jonathan McCalmont of the arts website Ruthless Culture has labeled the film as one of Pilat's most "intrusive" works. McCalmont has also stated that "One of the things that is most fascinating about Pialat as a director is that though completely devoid of sentimentality, his work also shows a perpetual awareness of the temptations that it offers... [its] lack of sentimentality presents itself as a ruthless focus upon the present."

Critic Miguel Marías of the film journal Senses of Cinema has praised the film, and commented that:

Director Michael Haneke has cited the film as being in his top 10 favourite films of all time.

See also

 End-of-life care
 Artistic realism
 French films of 1974
 List of Masters of Cinema releases

References

External links
 
 

1974 films
French drama films
1970s French-language films
Films about death
Films directed by Maurice Pialat
Works based on Così fan tutte
1974 drama films
1970s French films